Henri Copponex (25 September 1907, in Geneva – 9 June 1970), was a naval architect, a Swiss regatta competitor and an Olympic bronze medal winner for yacht racing in Rome in 1960.

Biography 
As a teenager, he was already designing models and testing them on water. Having become a civil engineer (with a degree from the Swiss Federal Institute of Technology in Zurich), he was also to become an emeritus naval architect and helmsman.

At the request of the Geneva Society for the Promotion of Yachting, Copponex designed the Moucheron in 1934, then the Lacustre in 1938. He also produced plans for Swedish 30 m2, 15 m2 SNS (Swiss National Series), and about thirty 5.5 m IR (International Rule), including the famous Ylliam X, Tam-Tam and Ballerina IV and V.

Following the success of the Lacustre, he designed the Espadon, which was to be, in his view, a more successful version of the Lacustre. In 1951, he again caused surprise by designing a catamaran. But Copponex was interested not only in racing boats. He also designed dinghies for life-saving societies, including those of Nyon, Saint-Prex, Morges and Le Bouveret. In 1969 Copponex designed his last boat, the Paladin.

During his sporting career he won about twelve national titles in 6 m IR, in 15 m2 SNS and in Lacustre. He took part in numerous international regattas: in 1928 at Cannes on a 6 m IR; at Genoa, where he won victory after victory in the 5.5 m IR series in 1952, 1958 and 1960. He represented Switzerland at the 1948 Olympic Games in Torquay (7th place in 6 m IR); then in 1952 at the Helsinki Olympic Games (10th place in 5.5 m IR). And it was at the Rome Olympic Games (Naples) in 1960 with the 5.5 m IR Ballerina IV that Henri Copponex, Manfred Metzger, the yacht's owner, and Pierre Girard won a bronze medal. It was exceptional that five of the sailing boats in the competition had been designed by Copponex.

With such a record, the “prince of the lake”, as one sport newspaper used to call him, became a legend in his lifetime. With his talent and strong personality, Copponex influenced Geneva yachting from the 1930s to 1970s. He was also liked for his human qualities, his simplicity and modesty.

His premature death in 1970 deprived sailing enthusiasts of a great sportsman and a talented naval architect. Every year the Société Nautique de Genève holds the Copponex Memorial, a regatta in tribute of the deceased great architect and sportsman.

Association of Archives Henri Copponex
The Association of Archives Henri Copponex was constituted in 2006. It is headed up by Françoise Copponex, the daughter of Henri Copponex, and it also  includes among the members of its committee: Pierre Girard, team member and a friend of Henri Copponex, vice-president, and Carinne Bertola, the curator of Lake Geneva museum. The association aims to support the conservation of Henri Copponex's work and organize various events to make it endure. In order to conserve the work of the naval architect, the Association of AHC has for the first project to digitize all existing plans (about 700 pieces).

References

External links
  Bulletin de l'association Amis des musées de Nyon parlant sur l'exposition Henri Copponex, Le Prince du Lac au Musée du Léman en septembre 2007 - février 2008
 

1907 births
1970 deaths
Swiss male sailors (sport)
Sailors at the 1948 Summer Olympics – 6 Metre
Sailors at the 1952 Summer Olympics – 5.5 Metre
Sailors at the 1960 Summer Olympics – 5.5 Metre
Olympic sailors of Switzerland
Olympic bronze medalists for Switzerland
Olympic medalists in sailing
Medalists at the 1960 Summer Olympics